Asya Ramazan Antar, also known as Viyan Antar, was a Kurdish Women's Protection Units (YPJ) fighter who has become a symbol of the feminist struggle in the Rojava conflict and in the fight against ISIS, by international media.

In 2014, Antar joined the YPJ with the aim of fighting against the Islamic State. After photos of her spread across the internet, she was dubbed "the Kurdish Angelina Jolie" by international media for her physical resemblance to the actress. Other Kurdish fighters and activists of the Kurdish cause described these comparisons as sexist and objectifying.

Early life
Born into a Kurdish family, Antar married very young through a marriage arranged by her family. After three months, she got divorced and joined the ranks of the Women's Protection Units (YPJ) to fight for the emancipation of women from the hands of patriarchal oppression in the region.

Transcendence in the media
Antar gained international attention in 2015 when a photojournalist took photos of her and described her as "the Kurdish Angelina Jolie". Many media sites recirculated the photos, turning it into news and also comparing her with Spanish actress Penélope Cruz.

After her death, news headlines announced "the Kurdish Angelina Jolie has died," emphasizing the physical resemblance between the two as much as her participation in the fight against ISIS. This was condemned by supporters of the Kurdish cause including other fighters.

Reactions and accusations of sexism
The media's treatment of her as a person was seen as demeaning by many Kurdish activists, especially given Antar's feminist leanings. Choman Kanaani, an activist and Kurdish fighter who repudiated the Western media's treatment of Antar, told the BBC that, "The entire philosophy of YPJ is to fight sexism and prevent using women as a sexual object". He added:

Death
On August 30, 2016, three ISIS suicide bombers drove cars filled with explosives towards the Kurdish front line. Antar and other YPJ fighters destroyed two of the cars but the third detonated close to Antar, killing her. Her death was announced on Facebook on August 31, saying she was "martyred in battle against Daesh [ISIS]".

See also
 Rojava

References

1997 births
2016 deaths
Kurdish feminists
Kurdish activists
Kurdish women activists
Kurdish female military and paramilitary personnel
People of the Syrian civil war
People killed in the Syrian civil war
Kurdish women's rights activists